The 1916 New Zealand census was the sixteenth national population census. The day used for the census was Sunday, 15 October 1916. The census of the Dominion of New Zealand revealed a total population of 1,149,225 - an overall increase of 90,981 or 8.59% over the 1911 census figure.

Enumeration
In 1916 a new departure was made in connection with the enumeration of Māori. The Māori census counted 49,776 (excludes Māori counted in the European census) for a total of 52,997, fewer than 1,900 reside in the South Island.
It was decided to enumerate the (South Island) Māori with the enumeration of the European population, the same schedules being used and the work done by the same Enumerators and Sub-Enumerators as for the European population. The North Island Māori census, however, was also taken in October.

Cost
The census of 1916 witnessed an important innovation in respect of the mode of distribution and collection of the census schedules, resulting in a considerable saving of expense. This was the substitution of the machinery of the Post Office for the old system of special Enumerators.

Not only was the work performed more economically (the cost of collection was approximately £20,600 in 1911 and £17,500 in 1916), but the schedules were in much better condition than at any previous census, the proportion of incomplete entries being infinitesimal, and the necessity for queries being reduced to practically nil.
A point in connection with the 1916 census was the increase in the number of Enumerators' districts—ninety-five, as compared with fifty-nine in 1911—and it is probable that the consequential reduction in the average size of the districts made for increased efficiency.

Summary
The results of the census covered these topics: (Separate Volumes) (published 1920) 
Part I Population (published 1918) 
Part II Ages (published 1918) 
Part III Birthplaces and Length of Residence (published 1918) 
Part IV Religions (published 1918) (20pp) 
Part V Education (published 1918)
Part VI Infirmity (published 1918) 
Part VII Conjugal Condition (published 1918) 
Part VIII Fertility (published 1919) 
Part IX Occupations and Unemployment (published 1919) 
Part X Race Aliens (published 1919) 
Part XI Dwellings (published 1919) 
Part XII Households (published 1920) 
Appendix A Maori Census
Appendix B Population of Cook and Other Annexed Pacific Islands*
Appendix C Religious Denominations (Places of Worship etc.) and Libraries
Appendix D Census of Industrial Manufacture*
Appendix E Poultry and Bees

Population and dwellings
The principal natural divisions in New Zealand are the North, South, and Stewart Islands. These contain nearly the whole population of European descent, the Cook and other annexed islands being inhabited almost solely by Natives.The populations of the various provincial districts are as follows:

Distribution

 European, (Māori living as Europeans) and others. (excluding Māori and residents of Cook and other Pacific islands).
 Includes 3,529 half-castes living as Māoris.

Notes: † Includes 112 soldiers in camp in New Zealand.

Birthplace
Question 8 on the census form asked the question: (a.) Country where born... (not county, town or subdivision.) If born outside the British Empire or if born at sea, add "P." if a British subject by parentage, add "N". if a British subject by nationalization.
The figures show that of the total population of specified birthplace (1,097,841), 1,077,808, or 98.17 per cent., were born on British soil, 1.70 per cent, on foreign soil, and 0.13 per cent, at sea.
For the overseas-born census usually resident population:

Race
The census form asked the question (a.) Country where born... (b.) Race.

Māori census

Religion
Members of Christian denominations formed 95.71 per cent. of those who made answer to the inquiry at the last census; non-Christian sects were 0.44 per cent.; and those who described themselves as of no religion 0.39 per cent.; whilst "indefinite" religions constituted 1.12 per cent.

Notes

References

Censuses in New Zealand
Census
New Zealand